Kruopiai (formerly) is a village in Kėdainiai district municipality, in Kaunas County, in central Lithuania. According to the 2011 census, the village was uninhabited.

History

During the 1970s Kruopiai was merged to Labūnava (became its northern part). Later, some farther homesteads were again declared as Kruopiai village.

Demography

References

Villages in Kaunas County
Kėdainiai District Municipality